Synodic, may refer to:

 Synodic day
 Synodic month
 Synodic orbital period, synodic year or synodic time, the time of an celestial object reappearing in relation two other objects